In crystallography, the triclinic (or anorthic) crystal system is one of the 7 crystal systems. A crystal system is described by three basis vectors. In the triclinic system, the crystal is described by vectors of unequal length, as in the orthorhombic system. In addition, the angles between these vectors must all be different and may not include 90°.

The triclinic lattice is the least symmetric of the 14 three-dimensional Bravais lattices. It has (itself) the minimum symmetry all lattices have: points of inversion at each lattice point and at 7 more points for each lattice point: at the midpoints of the edges and the faces, and at the center points. It is the only lattice type that itself has no mirror planes.

Crystal classes

The triclinic crystal system class names, examples, Schönflies notation, Hermann-Mauguin notation, point groups, International Tables for Crystallography space group number, orbifold, type, and space groups are listed in the table below. There are a total of 2 space groups.

With each only one space group is associated. Pinacoidal is also known as triclinic normal. Pedial is also triclinic hemihedral.

Mineral examples include plagioclase, microcline, rhodonite, turquoise, wollastonite and amblygonite, all in triclinic normal.

See also
Crystal structure
Crystal system

References

 Hurlbut, Cornelius S.; Klein, Cornelis, 1985, Manual of Mineralogy, 20th ed., pp. 64 – 65,

External links

Crystal systems